Brisbane Broncos Women are a rugby league team, representing the city of Brisbane, Queensland. The team is part of the Brisbane Broncos club and plays in the National Rugby League Women's Premiership.

Seasons

Head-to-head records
Table last updated: 23 October 2022.

Notes
 Share % is the percentage of points For over the sum of points For and Against.
 Clubs listed in the order than the Broncos Women first played them.

Coach 
In mid-November 2022 the Broncos announced the appointment of Scott Prince as head coach for the 2023 NRL Women's season.

Current squad 
The Brisbane Broncos announced that the following players had signed to play with the club in the 2022 NRL Women's season.

The team was coached by Kelvin Wright.
Jumper numbers in the table reflect those used in the Round 5 match.
Table last updated on 23 Oct 2022.

Club Records

Player Records 
Lists and tables last updated: 23 Oct 2022.

Most Games for the Broncos
 Ali Brigginshaw  23, Chelsea Lenarduzzi  22, Tarryn Aiken  19, Julia Robinson  18, Amber Hall  18, Lavinia Gould  16, Tallisha Harden  15.

Most Tries for the Broncos
 Julia Robinson  8,  Tamika Upton  7, .Ali Brigginshaw  7, Shenae Ciesiolka  7, Tarryn Aiken  6.

Most Points for the Broncos (20+)

Most Points in a Season (16+)

Margins and Streaks 
Biggest winning margins
 

Biggest losing margins

Most consecutive wins
 8  (6 October 2019  13 March 2022)
 6  (9 September 2018  21 September 2019)

Most consecutive losses
 3  (3 April 2022  27 August 2022)

History 
In 2017, the Brisbane Broncos launched a bid to enter a team in the inaugural NRL Women's Premiership in 2018. On 27 March 2018, the club won a license to participate in the inaugural NRL Women's season, on the back of a strong bid which included the NRL's desire for a geographical spread. Paul Dyer was named as the coach of the women's side, but stepped down after the inaugural season to concentrate on his role as game development manager. Kelvin Wright was named his replacement in May 2019.

In June 2018, Ali Brigginshaw, Brittany Breayley, Heather Ballinger, Teuila Fotu-Moala and Caitlyn Moran were unveiled as the club's first five signings. Tain Drinkwater was also appointed the CEO of the team.

The club won the inaugural NRL Women's Premiership title by defeating the Sydney Roosters by 34–12 in the 2018 NRL Women's Premiership Grand Final.

Players

Reference

External links

Official sites
 Broncos Official Web Page
 Broncos Leagues Club

Statistics & information sites
 Brisbane Broncos Woman at Rugby League Project
Supporter sites
 BroncosHQ – Brisbane Broncos Fan Discussion Forum

 
NRL Women's Premiership clubs
Rugby clubs established in 2018
Rugby league teams in Brisbane
2018 establishments in Australia
Women's rugby league teams in Australia